The New Safe Confinement (NSC or New Shelter, rarely Arka) is a structure put in place in 2016 to confine the remains of the number 4 reactor unit at the Chernobyl Nuclear Power Plant, in Ukraine, which was destroyed during the Chernobyl disaster in 1986. The structure also encloses the temporary Shelter Structure (sarcophagus) that was built around the reactor immediately after the disaster. The New Safe Confinement is designed to prevent the release of radioactive contaminants, protect the reactor from external influence, facilitate the disassembly and decommissioning of the reactor, and prevent water intrusion.

The New Safe Confinement is a megaproject that is part of the Shelter Implementation Plan and supported by the Chernobyl Shelter Fund. It was designed with the primary goal of confining the radioactive remains of reactor 4 for the next 100 years. It also aims to allow for a partial demolition of the original sarcophagus, which was hastily constructed by Chernobyl liquidators after a beyond design-basis accident destroyed the reactor.

The word  is used rather than the traditional  to emphasize the difference between the containment of radioactive gases—the primary focus of most reactor containment buildings—and the confinement of solid radioactive waste, which is the primary purpose of the New Safe Confinement.

In 2015, the European Bank for Reconstruction and Development (EBRD) stated that the international community was aiming to close a €100 million funding gap, with administration by the EBRD in its role as manager of the Chernobyl decommissioning funds. The total cost of the Shelter Implementation Plan, of which the New Safe Confinement is the most prominent element, is estimated to be around €2.15 billion (US$2.3 billion). The New Safe Confinement accounts for €1.5 billion.

The French consortium Novarka with partners Vinci Construction Grands Projets and Bouygues Travaux Publics designed and built the New Safe Confinement. Construction was completed at the end of 2018.

Legacy structure

The original shelter, formally referred to as the Shelter Structure and often called the sarcophagus, was constructed between May and November 1986. It was an emergency measure to confine the radioactive materials within reactor 4 at the Chernobyl Nuclear Power Plant. The shelter was constructed under extreme conditions, with very high levels of radiation, and under extreme time constraints. The Shelter Structure was moderately successful in confining radioactive contamination and providing for post-accident monitoring of the destroyed nuclear reactor unit; it has been estimated that up to 95% of the original radioactive inventory of reactor 4 remains inside the ruins of the reactor building.

The Shelter Structure is primarily supported by the damaged remains of the reactor 4 building. These are largely considered to be structurally unsound as a result of explosive forces caused by the accident. Three major structural members support the roof of the Shelter Structure. Two beams, usually referred to as B-1 and B-2, run in an east-west direction and support the roof beams and panels. A third, more massive member, the "Mammoth Beam", spans the largest distance across the roof from east to west and assists in supporting the roof beams and panels. The roof of the shelter consists of  diameter steel pipes laid horizontally north to south, and steel panels that rest at an angle, also in the north-south direction.

The Shelter Structure was never intended to be a permanent containment structure. Its continued deterioration has increased the risk of its radioactive inventory leaking into the environment. Between 2004 and 2008, workers stabilized the roof and western wall of the shelter. However, construction of the New Safe Confinement was necessary to continue confining the radioactive remains of Chernobyl Nuclear Power Plant reactor 4.

Further upgrades to the area in preparation for New Safe Confinement construction were completed in 2010. These included road and rail connections, site services (power, water, drains, and communications), facilities for workers (including medical and radiation protection facilities), and the installation of a long-term monitoring system.

International design competition
In 1994, Ukraine's government held an international competition for proposals to replace the sarcophagus.

In the autumn of 1992, Design Group Partnership (DGP) of Manchester was invited to assist the Atomic Energy Authority (AEA) for the UK's submission for the international competition organized by the Ukrainian government.

DGP's senior management was assembled to generate a solution. David Haslewood suggested an arch, built off-site, and then slid over the existing Soviet-built sarcophagus because:
Off-site construction would minimize radiation doses of construction workers.
An arch would fit snugly over the damaged reactor excluding its chimney.
An arch would be easier to slide than a square box.

Of the 394 entries, only the British submission proposed a sliding arch approach. There was no top design choice, but the French submission came as second best with the UK and German proposals coming joint third.

Subsequently, a pan-European study (the TACIS programme) re-examined the proposals of the competition's top three finalists. The study selected the sliding arch concept as the best solution for their further investigations and recommendations, primarily to reduce the chance of the construction workers receiving a harmful dose of radiation. The French consortium named Novarka eventually won the contract for the final sliding arch design.

On 17 September 2007 Vinci Construction Grands Projets and Bouygues Travaux Publics announced that they won the contract to design and build the New Safe Confinement as 50/50 partners of the French consortium Novarka. The original 432 million euros contract comprises the design and construction of the New Safe Confinement and planned to employ 900 people at its peak.

The project has involved workers and specialists from at least 24 countries in addition to Ukraine.

Structural design 

The dimensions of the arch were determined based on the need to operate equipment inside the new shelter and decommission the existing shelter. Vertical walls assembled around, but not supported by the existing structures of the reactor building seal the ends of the structure.

The arches are constructed of tubular steel members and are externally clad with three-layer sandwich panels. These external panels are also used on the end walls of the structure. Internally, polycarbonate panels cover each arch to prevent the accumulation of radioactive particles on the frame members.

Each of the steel tubes is made of high-strength steel to reduce cost and assembly weight.

To prevent corrosion of the structure, stainless steel was chosen as the material for the inner and outer walls. An air conditioning system also circulates warm, dry air at 50 Pa between the layers of the panels to further prevent corrosion. Dehumidifiers keep the air below 40% humidity, preventing both condensation and water from dripping into the interior of the structure.

Design goals

The New Safe Confinement was designed with the following criteria:
 Convert the destroyed Chernobyl Nuclear Power Plant reactor 4 into an environmentally safe system (i.e., confine the radioactive materials at the site to prevent further environmental contamination).
 Reduce corrosion and weathering of the existing shelter and the reactor 4 building.
 Mitigate the consequences of a potential collapse of either the existing shelter or the reactor 4 building, particularly in terms of confining the radioactive dust that would be produced by such a collapse.
 Enable safe demolition of unstable structures (such as the roof of the existing shelter) by providing remotely operated equipment for their demolition.
 Qualify as a nuclear entombment device.

Foundation design 

The foundations of the New Safe Confinement were designed to meet the primary requirements:

 They must support the weight of the arches of the New Safe Confinement.
 They must support rail tracks across which the New Safe Confinement can roll  from the construction site into place over reactor 4.
 They must minimize the amount of digging and cutting into the upper layers of the ground, as the upper soil is heavily contaminated with nuclear material from the disaster.

The foundation was required to account for this difference without extensive site leveling.

Radioactive contamination from the accident created the technogenic layer. It consists of various materials including nuclear material, stone, sand, loamy sands, unreinforced concrete, and construction wastes. It is considered unfeasible to determine the geotechnical characteristics of this soil layer. As a result of this, no assumptions about the load-bearing properties of the technogenic layer were made during the design of the foundation.

Several options were considered for the foundation design for the New Safe Confinement. This option was selected to minimize the cost of the foundation, the number of cuts into radioactive soil layers, dose uptake of workers, and risk to the environment from further contamination. The foundation has a slight elevation difference between the area in which the New Safe Confinement was constructed and the final resting area around reactor 4.

Special consideration was necessary for the excavation required for foundation construction due to the high level of radioactivity found in the upper layers of soil. The conceptual designers of the New Safe Confinement recommended the use of rope operated grabs for the first  of pile excavation for the Chernobyl site. This reduced the direct exposure of workers to the most contaminated sections of the soil. Deeper excavation for the foundation piles were accomplished using hydraulic clam shells operated under bentonite slurry protection.

The original design for the structure required it to withstand an F1 tornado until an independent beyond-design-basis analysis was carried out to evaluate the effects of an F3 tornado on the structure.

Assembly process

The system used in the assembly of the New Safe Confinement derived from civilian bridge launching and bridge cantilever methods. The New Safe Confinement was assembled in the following steps:
 Stabilization of the Shelter Structure to prevent collapse during construction.
 Excavation and construction of the foundation.
 Assembly of first and second arches to form Bay 1, installation of east wall on arch 1.
 Bay 1 was slid East to accommodate the construction of arch 3 and Bay 2.
 Subsequent sliding of the complete structure and adding of arches and bays to complete the structure.
 Installation of cranes and large maintenance equipment.
 Installation of the west wall.
 Final slide into place over reactor 4.
 Deconstruction of the fragmentation, decontamination, and auxiliary buildings. (planned)

This process of assembly was deemed advantageous because it took advantage of the designed mobility of the structure to maximize the distance between workers and the reactor building, thereby minimizing their exposure to radiation.

As each bay was completed, infrastructure equipment—including that for ventilation systems, radiation monitoring, plumbing, and electrical was installed.

Positioning

Sliding of the structure along foundation rails was a difficult process. It was pushed on Teflon pads by hydraulic pistons, and guided by lasers. , the New Safe Confinement is the world's largest movable land-based structure.

Two options were initially considered for moving the structure: hydraulic jacks to push the structure forward, or pulling the structure with large, multi-stranded steel cables. The first option would require the relocation of the hydraulic jacks after each push. This process would necessitate more worker interaction with the system and a greater worker exposure to radiation. The second option was initially chosen because it would expose workers to a lower radiation dose, and would have moved the structure into its final position in less than 24 hours. However, the structure was moved using hydraulic jacks, beginning the  move on November 14, 2016, and finishing on November 29.

Demolition of existing structures 
The operational phase of the New Safe Confinement involves the demolition of the unstable structures associated with the original Shelter Structure. The goal of demolition has imposed significant requirements upon the load carrying capacity of the arches and foundation of the New Safe Confinement, as these structures must carry the weight of not only the disassembled structure, but also the suspended cranes to be used in demolition.

Demolition equipment
The New Safe Confinement design includes two bridge cranes suspended from the arches.

Each crane can carry a variety of interchangeable carriages. Three types of carriages have been designed for the New Safe Confinement:
One typical lifting carriage with a  carrying capacity.
One secure lifting carriage for shielded transportation of personnel, with a  carrying capacity.

The cranes' carriage interchangeability allows the rotation of the largest members to be demolished, reducing the overall size of the New Safe Confinement by approximately one arch bay.

After the members to be demolished are removed by crane they must be fragmented into pieces small enough to decontaminate. It is expected that the primary contamination of most demolished elements will be loose surface dust and can easily be removed. Decontamination will take place using vacuum cleaners with HEPA filters, grit blasting (for steel elements), and scarifying (for concrete elements). Once decontaminated to the maximum extent practical, pieces will be further fragmented for eventual disposal. Fragmentation tools include plasma arc cutting torches, diamond circular cutting wheels, and diamond wire cutting. The tools selected for the demolition process were selected based on a number of factors including minimization of individual and collective radiation exposure, the amount of secondary waste generated, the feasibility of remote operation, the cutting efficiency, fire safety, capital cost and operating costs.

The exact methods for disposing of wastes generated by the demolition process have not been determined, and may include on-site burial outside the New Safe Confinement for low-level waste, and long-term storage inside the New Safe Confinement for medium and high-level wastes. , no policy has been decided for the disposal and processing of fuel containing materials.

Elements to be demolished 
The following elements of the Shelter Structure are planned for demolition:

Types of materials to be demolished 
The elements that are to be demolished fall into several broad material types:
 Steel
 Flat (roof panels)
 Three-dimensional (pipes, trusses, beams)
 Reinforced concrete
 Pre-cast
 Cast in place
 Debris
 Fragments of steel structures and equipment
 Fragments of reinforced concrete structures
 Materials added after the Chernobyl accident to mitigate its consequences.

Waste storage
For the removal and storage of nuclear waste within the New Safe Confinement area, the strategies for removing waste is split into three systems. Disposal of solid nuclear waste had the Vector Radioactive Waste Storage Facility built near to the Chernobyl site, consisting of the Industrial Complex for Solid Radwaste Management (ICSRM), a nuclear waste storage site. It is being constructed by Nukem Technologies, a German nuclear decommissioning company, a subsidiary of the Russian Atomstroyexport. This storage is reported to be able to contain  of material. The storage is for both temporary high level waste as well as low and intermediate level long-term waste storage.

The Plant on Liquid Radwaste Management (PLRWM) was constructed to remove, store, and process liquid nuclear waste from the Chernobyl site. Processed liquid is turned into solid waste in 200-L barrels where it can then be stored long-term, at a rate of 2,500 cubic meters a year.

Spent fuel is stored long-term in the Spent Fuel Storage Facility. 232 storage containers of nuclear waste can be stored in the facility for an expected 100 years.

Worker safety and radioactive exposure
Even with the distance given from the main reactor during construction of the New Safe Confinement, construction workers were still subject to radiation. Before the slippage procedure began, construction workers may only have been able to stay on the site for 30 minutes at a time due to radiation. The concrete foundation reduced radiation to workers when assembling the structure, and workers were given decontaminated housing during construction.

Radioactive dust in the shelter is monitored by hundreds of sensors. Workers in the 'local zone' carry two dosimeters, one showing real-time exposure and the second recording information for the worker's dose log. Workers have a daily and annual radiation exposure limit. Their dosimeter beeps if the limit is reached, and the worker's site access is cancelled. The annual limit (20 millisieverts) may be reached by spending 12 minutes above the roof of the 1986 sarcophagus, or a few hours around its chimney. Workers are required to also check their radiation exposure before they leave the New Safe Confinement as an additional measurement for safety.

To minimize radiation to workers when working inside of the New Safe Confinement, many robots and tools are used to interact with objects inside the shelter remotely. The two installed bridge cranes can be operated from within an isolated control room, which allows for demolition to occur without posing risk to any operators. For the radiation mapping that occurs within the New Safe Confinement, robots have been deployed in both areas of high contamination where humans cannot enter and replacing routes that operators would normally take. Boston Dynamics' Spot model has been implemented in areas of higher radiation to provide very detailed radiation mapping without causing additional radiation spikes by minimizing contact points with radiated surfaces. Without posing risk to workers, the implemented systems were able to look inside reactor 4, deep within the New Safe Confinement.

Project timeline and status 

There has been concern about Ukraine's ability to properly maintain the New Safe Confinement, with Deputy project manager Victor Zalizetskyi stating that "It looks like Ukraine will be left alone to deal with this structure"

The New Safe Confinement was originally intended to be completed in 2005, but the project has suffered lengthy delays.

Major project milestones include:
 March 2004  An international tender for New Safe Confinement design and construction is announced. Two bid candidates are identified, but in September 2006 the plant's general director Ihor Hramotkyn announces his intent to annul all bids on the project.
 September 17, 2007  The project contract is signed, with French consortium  (consisting of Vinci Construction Grands Projets and Bouygues Construction as 50/50 partners) constructing the  arch structure. Construction costs are estimated at $1.4bn with a project time of five years. The estimated time for completion is given as 53 months, including 18 months of planning and design studies, with a projected completion in mid-2012.
 2009  Progress is made with stabilization of the existing sarcophagus, which is then considered stable enough for another 15 years.
 September 2010  Novarka begins construction.
 April 2011  Some project milestones, including infrastructure and preparatory work such as the New Safe Confinement pilings, are completed.
 April 2012  Steel erection begins.
 November 26, 2012  The first sections are raised.
 June 13, 2013  The second lifting operation on the eastern arch is performed.
 April 2014  The fully lifted eastern arch is moved  eastward on its rails to a parking position to clear the construction area for building the western arch.
 August 4, 2014  The western arch completes the second of three lifting operations which raises the height of the arch.
 November 12, 2014  Successful completion of the third ascent of the western part arches.
 April 2015  The two arches are fused, and the west wall is under construction.
 April 2016  Construction of the arches is completed.
 November 14, 2016  The arch slipping procedure begins.
 November 29, 2016  The New Safe Confinement slipping is completed, taking a total of fifteen days. It is pushed on Polytetrafluoroethylene pads by hydraulic pistons, guided by lasers.
 December 2017  Construction completion is delayed until late 2018 due to a contractor being unable to finish its work in time. The reason is the extremely high level of radiation, forcing workers to limit their presence at the site to a minimum.
 January 2019  Various subsystems are in operation, including the radiation monitoring system, the back-up power supply system, the fire protection system, as well as lighting, communication, and HVAC.
 April 25, 2019 Successful conclusion of the 72-hour trial operation test.
July 2019  Construction on the €1.5 billion structure is completed and the sarcophagus is opened to media visits on July 3. On July 10, government officials, including Ukrainian President Volodymyr Zelenskyy, attended a ceremony where the transfer of ownership of the New Safe Confinement was given to the Ukrainian government.
February 24, 2022

 During the Russian invasion of Ukraine, Russian forces subsequently captured Chernobyl. While there is an increase in radiation in the area, this is due to Russian forces disturbing the soil in the Red Forest and releasing radioactive dust and not from the reactor 4 itself. The New Safe Confinement is reportedly unharmed.
March 31, 2022
 Russian forces leave Chernobyl and the New Safe Confinement.

Responsible organizations
The European Bank for Reconstruction and Development (EBRD) is responsible for managing the Shelter Implementation Plan, including overseeing the construction of the New Safe Confinement.

See also 
 Nuclear and radiation accidents and incidents

References

Notes

Further reading

Project Implementation Phase 2 from Chernobyl Nuclear Power Plant
SIP Project Summary Document from The European Bank for Reconstruction and Development

External links 

Official website: Chernobyl Nuclear Power Plant 
Description of the New Safe Confinement. Design of the new protective shield under Sarcophagus. 
 European Bank for Reconstruction and Development, Computer rendered video of the construction process, Novarka, October 2009 archived at Ghostarchive.org on 6 May 2022
November 2014, Chernobyl Story on CBS 60 Minutes
New Safe Confinement site live camera
  showing of New Safe Confinement being slid into position, 14–29 November 2016, European Bank for Reconstruction and Development channel archived at Ghostarchive.org on 6 May 2022

2019 establishments in Ukraine
Buildings and structures completed in 2019
Buildings and structures in Pripyat
Chernobyl Exclusion Zone
Energy infrastructure completed in 2019
Nuclear safety and security